Friedrich Schröder (6 August 1910 – 25 September 1972) was a Swiss composer of what could be referred to as light music.

Career

Born in Näfels, Switzerland, Schröder studied music in Stuttgart, Münster, and Berlin. Already in those early days he wrote film scores. For a short period between 1934 and 1937 he also worked as a Kapellmeister. He composed a number of operettas and Schlager, many of which have been popular ever since.

Schröder died in West Berlin, aged 62.

Operettas

Wedding Night in Paradise (1942; filmed in 1962 starring Peter Alexander, Marika Rökk, and Waltraut Haas)
Nächte in Changhai
Chanel Nr.5
Das Bad auf der Tenne
Die große Welt
Isabella

Schlager

"Ich tanze mit dir in den Himmel hinein"
"So stell ich mir die Liebe vor"
"Man müsste Klavier spielen können" (sung by Johannes Heesters et al.)
"Liebling, was wird nun aus uns beiden?"
"Komm mit mir nach Tahiti"
"Die Negermama singt ein uraltes Lied"
"Gnädige Frau wo war'n sie gestern?" ( a tango sung by Theo Lingen et al.)
"Träume kann man nicht verbieten"

Selected filmography
 A Gust of Wind (1942)
 The Big Number (1943)
 Peter Voss, Thief of Millions (1946)
 Nights on the Nile (1949)
 Professor Nachtfalter (1951)
 Shooting Stars (1952)
 A Very Big Child (1952)
 The Divorcée (1953)
 Hit Parade (1953)
 The Private Secretary (1953)
 My Sister and I (1954)
 The Bath in the Barn (1956)
 Voyage to Italy, Complete with Love (1958)
 Her Most Beautiful Day (1962)
 Breakfast in Bed (1963)

References

1910 births
1972 deaths
German opera composers
Male opera composers
20th-century classical composers
German male classical composers
20th-century German composers
20th-century German male musicians